In organic chemistry, an aza-crown ether is an aza analogue of a crown ether (cyclic polyether). That is, it has a nitrogen atom (amine linkage,  or ) in place of each oxygen atom (ether linkage) around the ring. While the parent crown ethers have the formulae , the parent aza-crown ethers have the formulae , where n = 3, 4, 5, 6.  Well-studied aza crowns include triazacyclononane (n = 3), cyclen (n = 4), and hexaaza-18-crown-6 (n = 6).

Synthesis
The synthesis of aza crown ethers are subject to the challenges associated with the preparation of macrocycles. The 18-membered ring in (CH2CH2NH)6 can be synthesized by combining two triamine components.  By reaction with tosyl chloride, diethylene triamine is converted to a derivative with two secondary sulfonamides.  This compound serves as a building block for macrocyclizations.

Variants
Many kinds of aza crown ethers exist.  
Variable length linkers
Aza crowns often feature trimethylene ((CH2)3) as well as ethylene ((CH2)2) linkages. One example is cyclam (1,4,8,11-tetraazacyclotetradecane).

Tertiary amines
In many aza-crown ethers some or all of the amines are tertiary. One example is the tri(tertiary amine) (CH2CH2NCH3)3, known as trimethyltriazacyclononane. Cryptands, three-dimensional aza crowns, feature tertiary amines.

Mixed ether-amine ligands
Another large class of macrocyclic ligands feature both ether and amines.. One example is the diaza-18-crown-6, [(CH2CH2O)2(CH2CH2NH)]2.

Lariate crowns
The presence of the amine allows the formation of Lariat crown ethers, which feature sidearms that augment complexation of cation.

References

Polyamines
Secondary amines
Tertiary amines
Ethyleneamines
Chelating agents
Macrocycles